The 37th Saturn Awards, honoring the best in science fiction, fantasy and horror film and television in 2010 were held on June 23, 2011.

Winners and nominees

Film

Television

Programs

Acting

DVD Releases

References

External links
 Official Saturn Awards website

Saturn Awards ceremonies
Saturn
2010 film awards
2010 television awards
2011 in California